This page is a list of 2016 UCI WorldTeams and riders. These teams competed in the 2016 UCI World Tour.

Riders





































Notes

References

See also 

 2016 in men's road cycling
 List of 2016 UCI Professional Continental and Continental teams
 List of 2016 UCI Women's Teams

2016 in men's road cycling
2016